OSU-6162 (PNU-96391) is a compound which acts as a partial agonist at both dopamine D2 receptors and 5-HT2A receptors. It acts as a dopamine stabilizer in a similar manner to the closely related drug pridopidine, and has antipsychotic, anti-addictive and anti-Parkinsonian effects in animal studies. Both enantiomers show similar activity but with different ratios of effects, with the (S) enantiomer (–)-OSU-6162 that is more commonly used in research, having higher binding affinity to D2 but is a weaker partial agonist at 5-HT2A, while the (R) enantiomer (+)-OSU-6162 has higher efficacy at 5-HT2A but lower D2 affinity.

See also 
 PF-219,061

References 

Dopamine agonists
Neuropharmacology
Benzosulfones
Piperidines